Serge Lofo Bongeli Senge (born 13 October 1983) is a DR Congolese professional footballer who plays as a Striker.

Club career
Born in Kinshasa, Lofo began his career on the youth side with AS Paulino Kinshasa and was in 1999 promoted to the senior team. After three years with AS Paulino, he joined in winter 2002 to TP Mazembe and played there two season before in January 2004 he was scouted by Angolan top club Atlético Sport Aviação. He had three successful seasons with AS Aviação and signed in February 2007 for Sagrada Esperança, but after one season with the team and four years in Angola he returned to his hometown Kinshasa, who signed with AS Vita Club. On 5 February 2010, he left AS Vita Club together with Tychique Ntela Kalema to sign with the German club Rot Weiss Ahlen, but this was not a big breakthrough for Serge. On 6 September 2010, he signed a one-year contract with the Belgian club FC Brussels.

In 2013, he was arrested in Israel on suspicion of murder, but he was released after his friend confessed that he was the one that did the murder.

International career
Lofo was capped nine times by the Congo DR national team, and scored 2 goals.

Career statistics

Honours
 2008: Linafoot Top Scorer

References

External links
 

1983 births
Living people
Footballers from Kinshasa
Atlético Sport Aviação players
AS Vita Club players
G.D. Sagrada Esperança players
Maccabi Netanya F.C. players
Rot Weiss Ahlen players
TP Mazembe players
Expatriate footballers in Angola
Expatriate footballers in Germany
Expatriate footballers in Israel
Democratic Republic of the Congo footballers
Democratic Republic of the Congo international footballers
Democratic Republic of the Congo expatriate sportspeople in Angola
Democratic Republic of the Congo expatriate sportspeople in Germany
Girabola players
Israeli Premier League players
Association football forwards
Daring Club Motema Pembe players
CSMD Diables Noirs players
Sharks XI FC players
R.W.D.M. Brussels F.C. players
Democratic Republic of the Congo A' international footballers
2009 African Nations Championship players
Democratic Republic of the Congo expatriate sportspeople in Israel